Ulerythema means "scar plus redness," and refers to several different cutaneous conditions, including atrophoderma vermiculatum and keratosis pilaris atrophicans faciei.

See also 
 Genodermatoses

References 

Genodermatoses
Dermatologic terminology